Manor House School is a private school in Cairo, Egypt. The school provides both National and International certificates (British and American). 

The school in its current creation was founded at Heliopolis in 1976 by Mrs Wanda Bullen at the request of the Egyptian government. Mrs Bullen, widow of Keith Bullen, had opened a Manor House School in Cairo some 30 years previously in 1946. This school, however, was sequestered by the Egyptian authorities at the time of the Suez crisis and the name was changed to Port Said School. Mrs Bullen and her daughter Anne had operated Manor House School in Beirut in the meantime. 

In 1977, an additional branch was opened in Mohandeseen and - in 1992 - a separate International faculty was also established at Mohandaseen offering the International General Certificate of Secondary Education based on the British system of education.

The original Mohandeseen National School branch also continued to grow, so another Manor House School section was opened in October 2000, 20 km west of Cairo. This is the largest of the Manor House Schools. This school includes KG to Grade 11 and Grade 12.

In September 2001, Manor House Schools started an American Program for the High School Certificate. This began with a small group of students in the main I.G.C.S.E. building, sharing the facilities. In September, 2003 the American Division moved to its own building nearby.

See also
List of schools in Egypt

References

Salwa El-Sayed School Daze Egypt Today May 2006
"Skill Link" Close up on Professions: "Never Left School"

External links

British Council interview

Schools in Cairo
Educational institutions established in 1976
1976 establishments in Egypt